Multiple object tracking, or MOT, is a versatile experimental paradigm developed by Zenon Pylyshyn for studying sustained visual attention in a dynamic environment in 1988. 

It was first developed in order to support visual indexing theory (FINST theory). MOT was then commonly used as an experimental technique in order to study how our visual system tracks multiple moving objects. Dozens or perhaps hundreds of modified MOT experiments have been conducted as a continuous attention-demanding task to further understanding human's visual and cognitive function.

Overview

Visual Indexing Theory 
Multiple object tracking was first developed in 1988 by Zenon Pylyshyn in order to support visual indexing theory. Visual indexing theory proposes a psychological mechanism that includes a set of indexes that can be associated with a visible object in the environment, and each index retains its association with an object even when that object moves or changes appearance.
 
Visual indexing theory is also called FINST theory, which abbreviates ‘fingers of instantiation’. Pylyshyn uses the analogy of fingers as indexes in this theory. If a person were to put his fingers on five different objects, and when the objects change location, the fingers still stay in contact with each object respectively. In other words, analogous to fingers attaching to objects, visual indexing theory suggests that individual objects have a small number of indexes that are also attached to them. These indexes obtain unique relational properties to the objects, and are independent when the objects change locations, thus allowing these objects to be tracked when their locations move.

Development of multiple object tracking task 
MOT task is an attentional paradigm that is developed with several unique features in mind in order to test visual indexing theory. When MOT task was first designed, the researchers aimed to study how successfully humans were able to keep track of several moving objects, therefore these unique features are:

First, unlike many other paradigms that only require participant's brief attentional shifts, MOT task requires continuous sustained attention for a prolonged period of time.
Second, MOT task involves multiple objects to be tracked instead of focal attention on one target.
Third, MOT task allows researchers to look at many aspects of visual attention, including selectivity, capacity limitation, sustained processing effort, etc.
Lastly, another key feature is that MOT task is able demonstrate that our visual attention is spatially divided.

Originally created to as a continuous attention demanding task in order to test the FINST theory, MOT task has been adopted and modified by many laboratories all over the globe and used in various ways.

Procedure

Typical MOT task 
During a most typical MOT task, eight identical items, usually filled circles, are presented to a participant in the beginning of the task, as shown on the figure above. Some of the items will be highlighted for a short period of time (by blinking or changing color) indicating that they are the targets to be tracked by the participant (a). 

Then after the targets reverting to the identical state, all items will start moving around unpredictably, bumping into each other or the boarder (b). After a short period of time, these items will stop moving simultaneously. The participant then is asked either to identify all targets (full report) by clicking on the targets (c) or to identify if one specified item is one of the targets (partial report).

Modification 
Typical MOT task itself is quite straightforward, the most central result in the experiment conducted by Pylyshyn in 1988 is that it is possible for humans to keep track of multiple moving objects. However, the strength of MOT task lies in its versatility.

By manipulating properties such as the color, shape of the moving target, or by changing the direction or speed of the movement of them, MOT task can become an entirely new attentional task to study many other aspects of cognitive and visual system, such as grouping effect, spatial memory, task switching, spatial resolution, visual occlusion, etc. More generally, MOT has been used as a paradigm to study the operation of attention in many different populations including children with autism spectrum disorder, etc.

Significant findings

Some unique properties of MOT tasks:

   Up to a maximum of 5 moving objects can be tracked successfully out of 10 total objects, as a typical MOT task shows. However, this capacity may be changed based on the speed of the moving targets. Up to 8 moving targets can be tracked if they are moving at a relatively low speed, while only 1 target can be tracked if they are moving at a high speed.
   Moving objects are still being tracked when they are behind an occluder. Under certain situations, they also can be tracked even if all targets disappear together for a very brief amount of time.
   A person is able to complete two MOT tasks simultaneously if the targets are presented to the participant in separate hemifields. In other words, participant is able to track twice as many moving objects if the objects are divided between the left and right hemifields.
   The properties of moving targets are not relevant to the performance of MOT task. Also participants have a very hard time to detect any property change of the targets during a mot task. In other words, even when targets are successfully tracked, participants can still have trouble recalling any color or shape change during the moving phase.

MOT task study among different populations:

   MOT capacity can also be increased with training. Action video game players can perform better on MOT tasks, tracking more targets successfully compare to non-video game players. Radar operators can also perform really well on MOT tasks without much task specific training.
   Children with autism spectrum disorder perform worse on MOT task compare to healthy children. Studies have suggested that children with autism may suffer from attentional deficits issues, therefore impacting the overall MOT task performance.
   Compare to non-athletes, basketball players also perform much better on MOT task, suggesting that basketball players have high cognitive functions at allocating resources to multiple targets while inhibiting identical looking distractors.
   Out of the three groups (child group age 7– 12 years old, adult group age 18–40 years old, and older adult group age 65 years and older), Adult group have the best MOT task performance, followed by child group. Older adult performed the worst among the three groups. It is suggested that stereopsis, the ability to perceive depth, helps children and adults accomplish MOT task more successfully, but has no impact on older adults.
   Compared to a group of participants who practiced relaxation, participants practicing mindful breath awareness meditation for around 10 minutes per day over 8 weeks significantly improved their MOT task performance and displayed more efficient neural activity, reflected in a reduced SSVEP signal.

References

External links
See Yale Perception and Cognition laboratory webpage for an example of a typical multiple object tracking task.

Visual perception